Hamza Mustafa Abboud (born 1 November 1984) is a Lebanese footballer who plays as a right-back for  club Akhaa Ahli Aley.

Abboud played for Safa between 2008 and 2013, winning two league titles, one FA Cup, and two Elite Cups, as well as finishing runner-up in the 2008 AFC Cup. In 2013 he moved to Ansar, where he won an FA Cup, before joining Nejmeh in 2017, who sent him on loan to Nabi Chit. After one season on loan, Abboud stayed another season at Nabi Chit, who changed their name to Bekaa, before moving to Bourj in 2019.

Abboud also represented Lebanon internationally between 2009 and 2011, playing 10 games.

Club career 
Abboud began his senior career at Safa during the 2008–09 Lebanese Premier League. He scored in the 2008 AFC Cup semi-final against Dempo, helping his side reach the final. Safa lost the final 10–5 on aggregate to Al-Muharraq, and finished as runners-up of the tournament. In 2009, Abboud helped Safa win their first Lebanese Elite Cup, before winning it again in 2012. Abboud also won Safa's first two Lebanese Premier Leagues, in 2011–12 and 2012–13, as well as a Lebanese FA Cup, in 2012–13.

On 23 August 2013, Abboud officially moved to Ansar, after negotiations that lasted nearly 45 days. Abboud stayed for four seasons, between 2013–14 and 2016–17, winning a Lebanese FA Cup in the latter season. In 2017, Abboud moved to Nejmeh, who subsequently moved him on loan to Nabi Chit. The following season, Nabi Chit changed their name to Bekaa, and bought Abboud from Nejmeh on a permanent basis. On 18 May 2019, Bourj officially announced the signing of Abboud. He moved to Akhaa Ahli Aley on 6 July 2022.

International career 
Abboud made his senior international debut for Lebanon on 19 August 2008, in a friendly against India. Lebanon won 1–0 away from home. Abboud played 10 games between 2009 and 2011, with his last matches being the 2014 FIFA World Cup qualifying matches against Bangladesh, which Lebanon won 4–2 on aggregate.

Honours 
Safa
 Lebanese Premier League: 2011–12, 2012–13
 Lebanese FA Cup: 2012–13
 Lebanese Elite Cup: 2009, 2012
 AFC Cup runner-up: 2008

Ansar
 Lebanese FA Cup: 2016–17

Akhaa Ahli Aley
 Lebanese Challenge Cup: 2022

Individual
 Lebanese Premier League most appearances: 2009–10

References

External links

 
 
 
 
 

1984 births
Living people
People from Tyre District
Lebanese footballers
Association football fullbacks
Safa SC players
Al Ansar FC players
Nejmeh SC players
Al Nabi Chit SC players
Bekaa SC players
Bourj FC players
Akhaa Ahli Aley FC players
Lebanese Premier League players
Lebanon international footballers